Mezquita, is the Spanish language word for mosque.

Mezquita may also refer to:

Structures
 The Mezquita-Catedral, an architectural landmark in the city of Córdoba, Spain
 Mezquita de las Tornerias, the Center Foundation of Promotion of the Crafts, a former mosque in Toledo, Spain
Mezquita-Iglesia de El Salvador, Toledo

Populated places
 Mezquita de Jarque, a town in Aragón, Spain
 A Mezquita, a town in Galicia, Spain.

Other
 José Jorge Mezquita García, a Valencian pilota professional player
 Mezquita (band), a Spanish rock music band.

See also
 Mesquite (disambiguation)